Handy Andy is a 1934 American comedy film directed by David Butler and written by William M. Conselman, Kubec Glasmon and Henry Johnson, adapted in turn from the play "Merry Andrew" by Lewis Beach. The film stars Will Rogers, Peggy Wood, Mary Carlisle, Paul Harvey, Frank Melton and Roger Imhof. The film was released on July 27, 1934, by Fox Film Corporation.

Plot

Cast
Will Rogers as Andrew Yates
Peggy Wood as Ernestine Yates
Mary Carlisle as Janice Yates
Paul Harvey as Charlie Norcross
Frank Melton as Howard Norcross
Roger Imhof as Doc Burmeister
Robert Taylor as Lloyd Burmeister
Grace Goodall as Mattie Norcross
Jessie Pringle as Jennie
Conchita Montenegro as Fleurette
Adrian Rosley as Henri Duval
Gregory Gaye as Pierre Martel
Richard Tucker as Mr. Beauregard
Helen Flint as Mrs. Beauregard

Reception
The film was one of Fox's biggest hits of the year.

References

External links 
 

1934 films
1930s English-language films
Fox Film films
American comedy films
1934 comedy films
Films directed by David Butler
Films produced by Sol M. Wurtzel
Films scored by David Buttolph
Films with screenplays by Kubec Glasmon
American black-and-white films
1930s American films